Speed Factory Racing is an auto racing team based in Spain.

History
Speed Factory Racing was formed by Lithuanian rally driver Dalius Steponavicius in 2008 with a target to help and prepare race drivers for endurance racing.
During the period from 2008 to the end of 2014 Speed Factory Racing won three times Radical Masters Euro series in drivers classification (2008, 2009, 2012).
Speed Factory Racing Team has entered to European Le Mans Series in 2015  and run the Ginetta Nissan LMP3 car, Winning the III place in Team Classification. 2016-2018 Team run Ligier JS P3 in European Le Mans Series.

External links
Official Team Website
Official ELMS Website

Spanish auto racing teams

European Le Mans Series teams
Lithuanian auto racing teams
Auto racing teams established in 2008